On December 23, 2015, the power grid in two western oblasts of Ukraine was hacked, which resulted in power outages for roughly 230,000 consumers in Ukraine for 1-6 hours.  The attack took place during the ongoing Russo-Ukrainian War (2014-present) and is attributed to a Russian advanced persistent threat group known as "Sandworm". It is the first publicly acknowledged successful cyberattack on a power grid.

Description
On 23 December 2015, hackers using the BlackEnergy 3 malware remotely compromised information systems of three energy distribution companies in Ukraine and temporarily disrupted the electricity supply to consumers. Most affected were consumers of Prykarpattyaoblenergo (servicing Ivano-Frankivsk Oblast): 30 substations (7 110kv substations and 23 35kv substations) were switched off, and about 230,000 people were without electricity for a period from 1 to 6 hours.

At the same time, consumers of two other energy distribution companies, Chernivtsioblenergo (servicing Chernivtsi Oblast) and Kyivoblenergo (servicing Kyiv Oblast) were also affected by a cyberattack, but at a smaller scale. According to representatives of one of the companies, attacks were conducted from computers with IP addresses allocated to the Russian Federation.

Vulnerability
In 2019, it was argued  that Ukraine was a special case, comprising unusually dilapidated infrastructure, a high level of corruption, the ongoing Russo-Ukrainian War, and exceptional possibilities for Russian infiltration due to the historical links between the two countries. The Ukrainian power grid was built when it was part of the Soviet Union, has been upgraded with Russian parts and (as of 2022), still not been fixed. Russian attackers are as familiar with the software as operators. Furthermore, the timing of the attack during the holiday season guaranteed only a skeleton crew of Ukrainian operators were working (as shown in videos).

Method
The cyberattack was complex and consisted of the following steps:
 Prior compromise of corporate networks using spear-phishing emails with BlackEnergy malware
 Seizing SCADA under control, remotely switching substations off
 Disabling/destroying IT infrastructure components (uninterruptible power supplies, modems, RTUs, commutators)
 Destruction of files stored on servers and workstations with the KillDisk malware
 Denial-of-service attack on call-center to deny consumers up-to-date information on the blackout.
 Emergency power at the utility company’s operations center was switched off.

In total, up to 73 MWh of electricity was not supplied (or 0.015% of daily electricity consumption in Ukraine).

See also 
 2016 Kyiv cyberattack, which resulted in another power outage
 Ukrenergo, electricity transmission system operator in Ukraine
 2017 cyberattacks on Ukraine
 Russian-Ukrainian cyberwarfare
 Cyberwarfare by Russia

References

Further reading

External links 
 Adi Nae Gamliel (2017-10-6) "Securing Smart Grid and Advanced Metering Infrastructure".
 
 
 
 
 ICS-CERT, [https://www.cisa.gov/uscert/ics/advisories/ICSA-16-336-02)
 ICS-CERT, Cyber-Attack Against Ukrainian Critical Infrastructure (IR-ALERT-H-16-056-01)

Cyberattacks on energy sector
2015 in Ukraine
Russo-Ukrainian War
Power outages
December 2015 crimes in Europe
December 2015 events in Ukraine
Hacking in the 2010s
Russian–Ukrainian cyberwarfare